The 2015–16 Albanian Women's National Championship was the 7th season of women's league football under the Albanian Football Association.

2015–16 teams

League table

References

External links
Kampionati Federata Shqiptare E Futbollit 
Albanian Women's Football Championship 2014/15 UEFA.com

Albania
Women's National Championship
Albanian Women's National Championship seasons